Grant's Tomb, officially the General Grant National Memorial, is the final resting place of Ulysses S. Grant, 18th president of the United States, and his wife, Julia Grant. It is a classical domed mausoleum in the Morningside Heights neighborhood of Upper Manhattan in New York City. The structure is in the middle of Riverside Drive at 122nd Street, across from Riverside Church to the southeast and Riverside Park to the west.

Upon Grant's death in 1885, his widow declared he had wished to be buried in New York, and a new committee, the Grant Monument Association, appealed for funds. Progress was slow at first, since many believed the tomb should be in Washington, D.C., and because there was no architectural design to show. Eventually they selected a proposal by John Hemenway Duncan for a tomb of "unmistakably military character," modeled after the Mausoleum of Halicarnassus with twin sarcophagi. The tomb was completed in 1897, and the National Park Service has managed it since 1958. After a period of neglect, it has been restored and rededicated.

The mausoleum is a prominent architectural land feature visible from the Hudson River. Grant's Tomb is generally open to the public from Wednesdays through Saturdays. In addition to being a national memorial since 1958, Grant's Tomb was added to the National Register of Historic Places in 1966 and was designated an official New York City landmark in 1975.

History

Creation of Grant Monument Association
On July 23, 1885, Grant died of throat cancer at age 63 in Wilton, New York. Within hours of Grant's death, William Russell Grace, the Mayor of New York City, sent a telegram to Julia offering New York City to be the burial ground for both Grant and Julia. Grant's only real wish when he died was to be next to his wife when he was buried. In practice this eliminated all military cemeteries and installations (such as West Point) from consideration, as they did not permit women to be interred at the time. Grant's family agreed to have his remains interred in New York City. Grace wrote a letter to prominent New Yorkers the following day, to gather support for a national monument in Grant's honor:

The preliminary meeting was attended by 85 New Yorkers who established the Committee on Organization. Its chairman was former President Chester A. Arthur; its secretary was Richard Theodore Greener. The organization would come to be known as the Grant Monument Association (GMA).

Funding
The Grant Monument Association did not originally announce the function or structure of the monument; however, the idea of any monument in Grant's honor drew public support. Western Union donated $5,000 on July 29, the day the committee announced its proposal. The GMA continued to receive donations of large and small amounts. At a membership meeting, former New York State governor Alonzo Cornell proposed a fundraising goal of $1 million. Private industries such as insurance and iron-trading companies donated funds to the project. For every ton of coal the Consumers Coal Company sold, it gave a major donation of 37½ cents to the GMA. Although there was great enthusiasm for a monument to President Grant, early fundraising efforts were stifled by growing negative public opinion expressed by out-of-state press. The Clay County Enterprise in Brazil, Indiana, wrote, "We have not a cent for New York in the undertaking, and would advise that not a dollar of help be sent to the millionaire city from Indiana ... If the billions of New York are not sufficient to embellish the city ... let the remains be placed in Washington or some other American city." (September 11)

The opposition was vocal in the view that the monument should be in Washington, D.C. Mayor Grace tried to calm the controversy by publicly releasing Mrs. Grant's justification for the New York site as the resting place for her husband:

Criticism was not limited to the debate about the monument's location. According to The New York Times, there was discontent with the internal management of the GMA. Even though the GMA members were among the wealthiest in New York, they were making comparatively small donations to the effort they themselves were promoting. The New York Times characterized the members as "sitting quietly in an office and signing receipts for money voluntarily tendered." In this early stage, the GMA did not have a model for what the monument was to be; it continued to ask for donations without explaining its purpose, which frustrated and discouraged donors. Joan Waugh captured the feelings of the average citizen in her book, American Hero American Myth: "Why should citizens give money to build a monument whose shape was still a mystery?" The GMA did not propose a definitive plan for the monument until five years later. During its first few years, the GMA fell short of the fundraising expectations originally set by Alonzo Cornell. In the first year, 1885, the GMA raised just over $111,000, 10% of its goal. In the two years that followed, it raised just $10,000. The slow pace of fundraising caused some trustees to resign. No design for the structure yet existed, and without such a design, it was believed that fundraising efforts would continue to remain low.

Design competition

On February 4, 1888, after a year's delay, the GMA publicly announced the details of a design competition, in a newsletter entitled "To Artists, Architects, and Sculptors". This information was made public to the entire nation; it was also published in Europe. The GMA also proposed a new estimate for the monument's cost, which ranged from $500,000 to $1 million. The deadline for all designs was rescheduled three times and was then set for a final date of January 10, 1889.

The first design competition received 65 designs, 42 of which came from international entries. The Grant Memorial Association did not award an overall winner, and a second design competition was ordered. In April 1890, the Grant Memorial Association selected, from only five commissioned entries, the design of John Hemenway Duncan, who estimated his design would cost between $496,000 and $900,000. Duncan made his first architectural claims in 1883, designing the Washington Monument at Newburgh, the Newburgh Monument, and the Tower of Victory. Duncan built these structures to celebrate the centennial anniversary of the U.S. Revolutionary War, and he became a member of the Architectural League in 1887. Duncan cited as his design's objective: "to produce a monumental structure that should be unmistakably a tomb of military character." He wanted to avoid "resemblance of a habitable dwelling" as the structure was meant to be the epitome of reverence and respect. The tomb's granite exterior is modeled after the Mausoleum at Halicarnassus with Persian elements and but for the Ionic order of the exterior rotunda columns and the Doric columns of the porch, it resembles the Tropaeum Alpium. Within the tomb, the twin sarcophagi of Grant and his wife Julia are based on the sarcophagus of Napoleon Bonaparte at Les Invalides. The sarcophagi are constructed of granite quarried in Montello, Wisconsin.

Construction

By 1890, the GMA had a defined design and architect. Although the GMA was becoming more organized and the reality of the monument was becoming clearer, the debate over the monument's location reopened in Congress. In October 1890, U.S. Senator Hale introduced legislation to have the sarcophagi placed at a monument in Washington, DC. The legislation did not pass, but the effort reopened the debate over the proper place for the remains of Grant. A groundbreaking ceremony had already been scheduled for April 27, 1891, and although the parties had not agreed on a location for the monument by that date, a groundbreaking ceremony was still held. In June 1891, deliberations ended; the monument was to be built in New York City, and that month, the GMA hired a contractor named John T. Brady.

Construction began that summer, and by August, preliminary excavation was complete. Construction was on schedule until the GMA asked Duncan to alter his design in the spring of 1892; the design could not be as elaborate as originally planned because of the Association's inability to raise the sufficient funds. Construction was also slowed by a stonecutters' strike in 1892. After 1894, construction proceeded at a faster pace, and by 1896, work on the outside of the tomb was nearly complete. One innovative feature of the tomb construction is the use of Guastavino tile vaulting to support the circular floor above the perimeter of the downstairs atrium.

On April 17, 1897, Grant's remains were quietly transferred to an 8.5-ton red granite sarcophagus and placed in the mausoleum. The monument was dedicated ten days later on April 27, 1897, on the 75th-anniversary ceremony of Grant's birth on April 27, 1822. Julia Dent Grant, Grant's wife of nearly 40 years, died five years later in 1902 and was placed in a matching sarcophagus and laid to rest in the mausoleum beside her husband.

The sarcophagi are placed above ground, leading to a common riddle by comedian Groucho Marx, who often asked contestants on his radio and television quiz show You Bet Your Life: "Who was buried in Grant's Tomb?" The riddle is based on the use of the word "buried", and since neither of the Grants' tombs are underground, the correct answer is "no one". However, Marx often accepted the answer "Grant" and awarded a consolation prize to those who gave it. He used the question, among several other easy ones, to ensure that everyone won a prize on the show.

Decay and restoration

1930s restoration 
The initial restoration project began in December 1935 (38 years after the tomb opened), when Works Progress Administration laborers installed new marble flooring in the atrium. The WPA played a large role in sustaining the monument. Joan Waugh explains that "In the 1930s the tomb was barely maintained by funds from the Works Progress Administration." Shortly after the restoration project began, the old New York City Post Office was being demolished and donated two statues of eagles to decorate the front of the Grant Monument. The laborers of the WPA worked on several projects throughout the 1930s, including roof restoration, electric lighting and heating systems, and removing the purple stained glass windows. The Pittsburgh Plate Glass Company installed amber glass to replace the purple stained glass. Toward the end of the 1930s, a project began to restore the two reliquary rooms, where battle flags were displayed in trophy cases, and murals of a map in each marked Civil War battles. In 1938, the Federal Art Project selected artists William Mues and Jeno Juszko to design the busts of William T. Sherman, Phillip H. Sheridan, George H. Thomas, James B. McPherson, and Edward Ord. The WPA installed five busts in the circular wall of the atrium surrounding the sarcophagi. After the many contributions of the WPA, the Grant Monument Association held a re-dedication of the tomb on April 27, 1939.

NPS control 

In 1958, the National Park Service (NPS) was granted authority to oversee the monument. According to an NPS report, an historian admitted that when the NPS first assumed authority over the tomb, they "had no program for the site."  Combined with the mismanagement and devastation that New York City was going through financially in the 1960s to the 1990s, that led to great neglect of the site, particularly in the maintenance of the monument.

By the 1970s, the tomb was marred by vandalism and graffiti. Many places in the city, including Times Square, were in the same condition. Trash had heaped up around the monument, its exterior recesses were being used by drug users, the homeless, and criminals for hideouts. Graffiti covered the walls and pedestals, and vandals chipped away at the masonry. The NPS undertook a plan to remove the trophy cases in the reliquary rooms.

1990s restoration 

The abuse of the monument continued until renewed restoration efforts began in the early 1990s; in 1991, Frank Scaturro, a student at Columbia University and volunteer with the NPS, launched an effort to restore the tomb and brought his concerns to Congress. The tomb was still marred by graffiti and, at the time, there were only three maintenance workers and three rangers on daytime duty, with a yearly budget of $235,000. For over two years, Scaturro battled the National Park Service, which was charged with maintaining Grant's Tomb. He sent weekly memos, including a 26-page report in the summer of 1992. After two years of unsuccessful attempts to navigate the bureaucracy of the National Park Service, Scaturro published a 325-page whistleblower report, which he sent to Congress and the President. Scaturro's efforts drew national media attention and resulted in a $1.8 million grant to restore Grant's Tomb. According to Mr. Scaturro "whistle-blowing was the last resort." Scaturro stated "I only did what I did because I had no other resort ... the only thing left was abandoning the site and that was not an alternative to me." The tomb was in great need of renovation. A New York Times article articulated Mr. Scaturro's concerns, saying "improvements have detracted from the tomb's solemnity."

Scaturro's efforts to expose the monument's poor condition caught the attention of two Illinois state lawmakers. State Sen. Judy Baar Topinka and State Rep. Ron Lawfer sponsored a resolution to compel the National Park Service to meet its obligations in maintaining and restoring Grant's tomb. If the NPS did not comply, then Topinka and Lawfer demanded that Grant's remains be transported to the state of Illinois. Senator Topinka said, "He would be better off anywhere than New York, but my argument is not with New York; it's with the National Park Service."

The demands for restoration did not stop at the state level. In 1994, the U.S. House of Representatives introduced legislation to "restore, complete, and preserve in perpetuity the Grant's Tomb National Memorial and surrounding areas." The legislation set by the House required that the restoration be completed by April 27, 1997, the tomb's 100th anniversary and Grant's 175th birthday. On April 27, 1997, the restoration effort sanctioned by Congress was completed and the tomb re-dedicated. General Grant's descendants, who were appalled by the conditions of the tomb, called Scaturro a hero for his efforts.

Access and policies

The visitor center is located about 100 yards to the west of the mausoleum and contains a bookstore, memorabilia, movie about Grant's life, and restrooms.  The visitor center of General Grant National Memorial is accessible to people with disabilities, but the mausoleum is not. Generally, both are open Wednesday through Sunday, year-round; the visitor center is open from 9 a.m. to 5 p.m. while the tomb is open from 10 a.m. to 5 p.m. However, during the COVID-19 pandemic in New York City in 2020 and 2021, opening hours were restricted and part of the memorial was closed to the public.

Photography is allowed in the tomb, but cellphone use, eating, drinking, smoking, and gum chewing are not permitted. Flash photography is discouraged inside the tomb.

The M5 bus stops on either side of Grant's Tomb. The M4 and M104 bus routes run one block east, on Broadway, while the M11 and M60 bus lines run two blocks east, on Amsterdam Avenue.

Activities

Events 
Concerts are regularly held at or right outside Grant's Tomb. Examples include Jazzmobile, Inc.'s annual Free Outdoor Summer Mobile Concerts at Grant's Tomb and the annual Grant's Tomb Summer Concert, which in 2009 featured West Point's United States Military Academy Band. Every year on April 27, the anniversary of Grant's birth, a ceremony celebrating his life is held at the memorial.

Art
A sculpture consisting of seventeen concrete benches bearing colorful mosaics was created around the monument in the early 1970s. The sculpture, entitled The Rolling Bench, was designed by artist Pedro Silva and the architect Phillip Danzig, and was built with the help of hundreds of neighborhood children over a period of three years. The project was sponsored by CITYarts, a non-profit organization founded in 1968 to create works of public art by bringing together children and artists. The sculpture underwent restoration during the summer of 2008 under the supervision of Silva.

According to NYC Parks, "some popular local folk art in Riverside Park contrasts strikingly with the Tomb's severity".

See also

 List of national memorials of the United States
 Presidential memorials in the United States
 Bibliography of Ulysses S. Grant

References
Notes

Bibliography

Further reading
The National Parks: Index 2001–2003. Washington: U.S. Department of the Interior.

External links

Official NPS website: General Grant National Memorial
Grant Monument Association

1897 establishments in New York City
1897 sculptures
Biographical museums in New York City
General Grant National Memorial ("Grant's Tomb")
Buildings and structures completed in 1897
Government buildings on the National Register of Historic Places in Manhattan
History museums in New York City
Mausoleums on the National Register of Historic Places
Monuments and memorials in Manhattan
Monuments and memorials on the National Register of Historic Places in New York City
Morningside Heights, Manhattan
Museums in Manhattan
National Memorials of the United States
National Park Service National Monuments in New York City
Neoclassical architecture in New York City
New York City Designated Landmarks in Manhattan
New York City interior landmarks
Presidential museums in New York (state)
Riverside Park (Manhattan)
Tombs of presidents of the United States
Tourist attractions in Manhattan
General Grant NM ("Grant's Tomb")